The men's 300 m rifle three positions was a shooting sports event held as part of the Shooting at the 1964 Summer Olympics programme. It was the ninth appearance of the event at an Olympic Games. The competition was held on 15 October 1964, with 30 shooters from 18 nations competing. Nations had been limited to two shooters each since the 1952 Games. The event was won by Gary Anderson of the United States, the nation's first victory in the event since 1920 and second overall (tying Switzerland and the Soviet Union for most all-time). Both Americans made the podium, as Martin Gunnarsson took bronze. Shota Kveliashvili of the Soviet Union earned silver, extending the nation's podium streak to four Games.

Background

This was the ninth appearance of the men's 300 metre three-positions rifle event, which was held 11 times between 1900 and 1972. Three of the top 10 shooters from 1960 returned: gold medalist Hubert Hammerer of Austria, sixth-place finisher Vladimír Stibořík of Czechoslovakia, and ninth-place finisher Esa Kervinen of Finland. Gary Anderson of the United States was the reigning world champion and the favorite in this event. Auguste Hollenstein of Switzerland was the world record holder.

Hong Kong, Japan, Mongolia, and Thailand each made their debut in the event. Finland, Sweden, and the United States each made their eighth appearance, tied for most all-time.

Competition format

The competition had each shooter fire 120 shots, 40 shots in each position. Shots were fired in series of 10. The target was 1 metre in diameter, with 10 scoring rings; targets were set at a distance of 300 metres. Thus, the maximum score possible was 1200 points. Any rifle could be used.

Records

Prior to the competition, the existing world and Olympic records were as follows.

Gary Anderson set a new world record with his 1153 to win. Shota Kveliashvili was also above the old Olympic record.

Schedule

All times are Japan Standard Time (UTC+9)

Results

References

Shooting at the 1964 Summer Olympics
Men's 300m 3 positions